is a professional Japanese baseball player. He plays pitcher for the Hiroshima Toyo Carp.

On November 1, 2018, he was selected Japan national baseball team at the 2018 MLB Japan All-Star Series.

References

External links

NPB.com

1993 births
Living people
Hiroshima Toyo Carp players
Japanese baseball players
Nippon Professional Baseball pitchers
Baseball people from Tokyo